Barnard is a rural locality in the Central Highlands Region, Queensland, Australia.

Geography
The Dawson River forms the eastern boundary.

Road infrastructure
The Fitzroy Developmental Road passes to the west.

References 

Central Highlands Region
Localities in Queensland